The 2018–19 Maryland Eastern Shore Hawks men's basketball team represented the University of Maryland Eastern Shore in the 2018–19 NCAA Division I men's basketball season. They played their home games at the Hytche Athletic Center in Princess Anne, Maryland, and were led by interim head coach Clifford Reed. The Hawks finished the season 7–25, 5–11 in MEAC play to finish in a tie for eighth place. As the No. 8 seed in the MEAC tournament, they lost in the first round to South Carolina State.

Previous season
The Hawks finished the 2017–18 season 7-25, 3-13 in MEAC play to finish in 12th place. As the No. 12 seed in the MEAC tournament, they lost to Norfolk State in the first round.

On March 26, 2018, it was announced that head coach Bobby Collins' contract would not be renewed. He finished at UMES with a four-year record of 49–82. The school named assistant coach Clifford Reed interim head coach for the 2018–19 season.

Roster

Schedule and results

|-
!colspan=12 style=| Exhibition

|-
!colspan=12 style=| Non-Conference Regular season

|-
!colspan=12 style=| MEAC regular season

|-
!colspan=12 style=| MEAC tournament
|-

|-

Source

References

Maryland Eastern Shore Hawks men's basketball seasons
Maryland Eastern Shore Hawks
Maryland Eastern Shore Hawks men's basketball team
Maryland Eastern Shore Hawks men's basketball team